Malva hispanica, the Spanish mallow, is a species of flowering plant in the family Malvaceae, native to the western Mediterranean. Uniquely in its genus, Malva hispanica flowers possess a bilobed epicalyx, which is derived from an ancestral trimerous structure and represents a loss of the adaxial epicalyx lobe.

References

hispanica
Flora of Morocco
Flora of Algeria
Flora of Portugal
Flora of Spain
Plants described in 1753
Taxa named by Carl Linnaeus